The Fonseca Islands skink (Marisora urtica) is a species of skink found in Honduras.

References

Marisora
Reptiles described in 2020
Taxa named by Stephen Blair Hedges